KWEL (1070 AM/ 107.1 FM) is a radio station serving the Midland-Odessa area with a news/talk format. The station airs a serving of local programs and programs provided by Premiere Networks. The station is currently under ownership of CDA Broadcasting, Inc. KWEL's AM frequency does not air at night. It airs every day from 6am- 8 pm. The FM frequency airs 24-hours a day and is the frequency found on the internet stream.

1070 AM is a United States and Canadian clear-channel frequency, on which KNX in Los Angeles, California is the only Class A station.  However, a Class A license is available in Canada; CBA was a Class A station in Canada but moved to FM.  KWEL must leave the air during nighttime hours to protect the skywave signal of KNX.

Station schedule
Monday–Friday
6am – The Morning Show with Craig & Mark
10am – Mike Gallagher Show  Mike Gallagher (political commentator)
1pm – Eric Metaxas
2pm – The Sean Hannity Show
5pm – Mark Levin
8pm – Sebastian Gorka
11pm - Hugh Hewitt
2am - Larry Elder

Saturdays
6am - Music with Dorilynn
10am - Hoyl Financial Hour
11am- Doctor Bob Martin
2pm - Body Talk with Dr. Bill Dodson
3pm - Jacki Daily Show
4pm – The Sean Hannity Show
7pm – The Spirit of Radio Show

Sundays
7am - Texas Scorecard / EmpowerTexans / Michael Quinn Sullivan
7:30am - Lutheran Hour and Family Shield, sponsored by Grace Lutheran and Holy Cross Lutheran
8:30am - Family Gospel Music Hour, sponsored by Warren Bell
9:30am - Texas Scorecard
10am - Save the Cowboy, Sponsored by Western LLC
10:30am - Kelview Heights Baptist Church
11am - Lifestyles Unlimited
Noon - Wall Builders
12:30pm - Christian Tabernacle Church with Roy Langley
1pm - The Intersection with Larry Long
2pm - Tom Gresham's Gun Talk
5pm – Larry Elder
7pm - Armed American Radio

External links
Official KWEL Website

[itunes.apple.com/us/podcast/sports-spotlight-with-rj-pase/id1128575282?mt=2]

WEL
WEL
WEL